Days of Glory is a 1944 American film, directed by Jacques Tourneur, which tells the story of a group of Soviet guerrillas fighting back during the 1941 Nazi invasion of Russia. It marked the film debut of Tamara Toumanova and Gregory Peck, as well as most of the other principal actors. It was also the first film produced by screen writer Casey Robinson, who in early January 1943 had been contracted by RKO Radio Pictures to write and produce the film under the working title This Is Russia. Robinson and Toumanova married in 1944 and divorced in 1955. The film included the last screen appearance of actor Erford Gage, who subsequently entered the U.S. Army and was killed in action in 1945.

Plot
In the snowy Russian countryside of the early 1940s, Vladimir (Gregory Peck) leads a squad of nearly a dozen partisan fighters operating behind German lines. The group's routines are disrupted when Nina (Tamara Toumanova), a ballerina, is brought to their hideout after becoming separated from her troupe. She confesses she has neither handled a gun nor learned to fight, cook, mend, or clean. Vladimir favors sending her away. Later, a German soldier stumbles upon the group's lair but is captured. That night, he nearly escapes, but Nina shoots him, winning the approval of her new comrades. The next night, when the guerrillas carry out the sabotage of a German munitions train, Vladimir takes Nina along. The operation is a success. Yet although she and Vladimir are falling in love, Nina does not understand his ruthlessness. He explains that before the war he, as an engineer, had to destroy the very electric power plant he had helped build in order to keep the enemy from using it.

The couple's budding romance threatens the stability of the squad. At one point, when Vladimir must enlist someone to hand-deliver a coded message on Nazi troop strength to Soviet headquarters, he decides a woman courier would less likely be caught. He chooses the veteran Yelena (Maria Palmer), the only woman in the group besides Nina. So when Yelena's horse returns to their hideout with blood on the saddle, Nina then volunteers to take her place. Vladimir reluctantly accedes, sending the teen-aged boy Mitya (Glen Vernon) along with her. After Nina and Mitya reach headquarters and deliver Vladimir's information, she is given a coded reply to Vladimir: "The snow will fall tomorrow." This indicates that a massive Russian counterattack will begin the next day. Vladimir's superiors put him in charge of a merged partisan operation. Before the fighting begins, however, he orders Nina to take Mitya's younger sister, Olga (Dena Penn), to safety. Fighting bravely, the group's members are killed one by one, but Nina returns to Vladimir. As they fight on, he administers her the partisan oath of allegiance just before a German tank rolls atop their machine-gun nest and explodes.

Cast

 Tamara Toumanova as Nina Ivanova
 Gregory Peck as Vladimir
 Alan Reed as Sasha
 Maria Palmer as Yelena
 Lowell Gilmore as Semyon
 Hugo Haas as Fedor
 Dena Penn as Olga, Mitya's young sister
 Glen Vernon as Mitya (as Glenn Vernon)
 Igor Dolgoruki as Dmitri
 Edward L. Durst as Petrov (as Edward Durst)
 Lou Crosby as Johann Staub

Production
Days of Glory is one of a handful of Hollywood films made during American participation in World War II to increase public support for the country's alliance with the Soviet Union against Nazi Germany.  Such films, which would become the target of investigations during the Cold War by the House Committee on Un-American Activities, included Mission to Moscow, The North Star, Three Russian Girls, Counter-Attack, and Song of Russia.

Parts of the film were shot in Cedar City, Utah.

Reception
Bosley Crowther faulted the screenwriter for "letting his story progress so fitfully and loading his characters with dialogue rather than stirring deeds." He said "the director failed to make the best of what he had," and "Gregory Peck comes recommended with a Gary Cooper angularity and a face somewhat like that modest gentleman's, but his acting is equally stiff." The film recorded a loss of $593,000.

Award nominations
Vernon L. Walker, James G. Stewart, and Roy Granville were nominated for the Oscar for Best Effects.

See also
 List of American films of 1944

References

External links

 
 
 
 

1944 films
1944 romantic drama films
1940s war drama films
American pro-Soviet propaganda films
American romantic drama films
American black-and-white films
Eastern Front of World War II films
1940s English-language films
Films about the Soviet Union in the Stalin era
Films directed by Jacques Tourneur
Films scored by Daniele Amfitheatrof
1940s German-language films
Films shot in Utah
American war drama films
Guerrilla warfare in film
RKO Pictures films
1940s American films